The following is a list of the monastic houses in Cheshire, England.

See also

 List of monastic houses in England
 List of monastic houses in Wales

Notes

References

Bibliography

History of Cheshire
England in the High Middle Ages
Medieval sites in England
Lists of buildings and structures in Cheshire
.
.
.
Cheshire
Cheshire
.